Çağa is a town in the District of Güdül, Ankara Province, Turkey.

References

Populated places in Ankara Province
Güdül
Towns in Turkey